Silas Robbins (February 14, 1857 – September 11, 1916) was the first African American admitted to practice law in the U.S. state of Nebraska in 1889, and the first black person in Omaha, Nebraska to be admitted to the Nebraska State Bar Association.

Biography 
Prior to serving in Nebraska, Robbins was admitted to the bar in Indiana and Mississippi.

In 1887 Robbins became the second African American to run for Nebraska State Legislature, winning the endorsement of Gilbert Hitchcock's Omaha World-Herald. After losing the race, Robbins continued to serve in Omaha.

In 1889 Robbins became the first black lawyer admitted to practice in Nebraska, sixteen years after the Nebraska Supreme Court ruled that blacks could not be excluded from serving on juries.  In 1893 he secured a patent from the United States Patent Office for a game he created called "politics".

When the Populist Party took power in Omaha, Robbins served as the tax commissioner from 1900 to 1901 and again from 1903 to 1905.  Afterward he focused primarily on real estate law, and maintained a reputation as one of Omaha's "best known colored attorneys."

Robbins committed suicide on September 11, 1916, by a self-inflicted gunshot wound to the temple, apparently motivated by a long-time illness.

See also 
 African Americans in Omaha, Nebraska

References 

1916 suicides
African-American lawyers
Lawyers from Omaha, Nebraska
Year of birth unknown
Nebraska lawyers
Suicides by firearm in Nebraska
Nebraska Populists
Tax commissioners
1857 births
19th-century American lawyers
20th-century African-American people